Carthage is a city in Miner County, South Dakota, United States. The population was 127 at the 2020 census.

History
Carthage was platted in 1883. It was named after Carthage, New York.

Geography
Carthage is located at  (44.169550, -97.715801).

Carthage has been assigned the ZIP code 57323 and the FIPS place code 10220.

Demographics

2010 census
As of the census of 2010, there were 144 people, 80 households, and 37 families residing in the city. The racial makeup of the city was 96.5% White, 0.7% Asian, and 2.8% from two or more races.

There were 80 households, of which 15.0% had children under the age of 18 living with them, 36.3% were married couples living together, 8.8% had a female householder with no husband present, 1.3% had a male householder with no wife present, and 53.8% were non-families. 46.3% of all households were made up of individuals, and 21.3% had someone living alone who was 65 years of age or older. The average household size was 1.80 and the average family size was 2.46.

The median age in the city was 52.3 years. 16% of residents were under the age of 18; 5.7% were between the ages of 18 and 24; 18.2% were from 25 to 44; 34.7% were from 45 to 64; and 25.7% were 65 years of age or older. The gender makeup of the city was 50.7% male and 49.3% female.

2000 census
At the 2000 census, there were 187 people, 98 households and 52 families residing in the city. The population density was 128.1 per square mile (49.5/km). There were 143 housing units at an average density of 98.0 per square mile (37.8/km). The racial makeup of the city was 98.93% White, and 1.07% from two or more races.

There were 98 households, of which 14.3% had children under the age of 18 living with them, 49.0% were married couples living together, 4.1% had a female householder with no husband present, and 46.9% were non-families. 43.9% of all households were made up of individuals, and 28.6% had someone living alone who was 65 years of age or older. The average household size was 1.91 and the average family size was 2.63.

Age distribution was 16.0% under the age of 18, 6.4% from 18 to 24, 16.0% from 25 to 44, 26.2% from 45 to 64, and 35.3% who were 65 years of age or older. The median age was 51 years. For every 100 females, there were 98.9 males. For every 100 females age 18 and over, there were 84.7 males.

The median household income was $27,679, and the median family income was $32,917. Males had a median income of $26,750 versus $15,938 for females. The per capita income for the city was $15,100. About 13.2% of families and 17.4% of the population were below the poverty line, including 40.0% of those under the age of eighteen and 12.1% of those 65 or over.

In the media
Carthage is located exactly where Laura Ingalls Wilder described the "Brewster Settlement", the site where she taught her first school, in her novel These Happy Golden Years. The actual name of the site was "Bouchie Settlement", however.  It is unclear if Carthage grew out of the original Bouchie settlement or not.

Carthage gained a small amount of attention when it was featured in the book Into the Wild by Jon Krakauer. The book documents the travels of Chris McCandless, who along the way took a job at a grain elevator in the community in September 1990 and April 1992.

Notable person
Paul A. Magnuson, United States district judge

References

Cities in South Dakota
Cities in Miner County, South Dakota